The Borodino-class battlecruisers were a group of four battlecruisers ordered by the Imperial Russian Navy before World War I. Also referred to as the Izmail class, they were laid down in late 1912 at Saint Petersburg for service with the Baltic Fleet. Construction of the ships was delayed by a lack of capacity among domestic factories and the need to order some components from abroad. The start of World War I slowed their construction still further, as the imported components were often not delivered and domestic production was diverted into areas more immediately useful for the war effort.

Three of the four ships were launched in 1915 and the fourth in 1916. Work on the gun turrets lagged, and it became evident that Russian industry would not be able to complete the ships during the war. The Russian Revolution of 1917 halted all work on the ships, which was never resumed. Although some consideration was given to finishing the hulls that were nearest to completion, the three furthest from completion were sold for scrap by the Soviet Union during the early 1920s. The Soviet Navy proposed to convert Izmail, the ship closest to completion, to an aircraft carrier in 1925, but the plan was cancelled after political manoeuvring by the Red Army cut funding and she was eventually scrapped in 1931.

Design and development 
After the end of the Russo-Japanese War of 1905, the Russian Naval General Staff decided that it needed a squadron of fast armoured cruisers that could use their speed to engage the leader of an enemy's battle line, as Admiral Tōgō had done against the Russian fleet during the Battle of Tsushima. The Naval General Staff initially called for a ship with high speed,  guns, and limited protection (a waterline belt of ). The Tsar, head of the Russian government, approved construction of four such ships on 5 May 1911, but the State Duma session ended before the proposal could be voted on. Preliminary bids for the ships were solicited from private builders, but the bids proved to be very high, leading to a reconsideration of the requirements. The armament was increased to nine  guns in three non-superfiring triple-gun turrets, based on a false rumour that the Germans were increasing the calibre of the guns in their battleships. The Imperial Russian Navy believed that widely separating the main gun turrets and their magazines reduced the chance of a catastrophic ammunition explosion, reduced the silhouette of the ship and improved stability without superfiring turrets and their tall barbettes.

The Naval Ministry solicited new bids on 8 September from 23 shipbuilders, domestic and foreign, but only 7 responded, even after the deadline was extended by a month. Several designs were rejected for not meeting the revised criteria. In the meantime, the Artillery Section of the Main Administration of Shipbuilding had decided that it preferred a four-turret design, and new bids were solicited in May 1912 from the leading contenders from the first round of bidding. The eventual winner was a design by the Admiralty Shipyard in Saint Petersburg which had the extra turret added to a new hull section inserted into the original three-turret design.

The Duma approved construction in May 1912, before the design was finalised, and allocated 45.5 million rubles for each ship. Orders were placed on 18 September 1912 for a pair of ships each from the Admiralty Shipyard and the Baltic Works, also of Saint Petersburg. The first pair was to be ready for trials on 14 July 1916, and the second pair on 14 September 1916.

Full-scale armour trials in 1913 revealed serious weaknesses in the Borodinos' proposed protection scheme. The obsolete ironclad  had been modified with armour protection identical to that used by the s, then under construction. The deck and turret-roof armour proved to be too thin, and the structure supporting the side armour was not strong enough to withstand the shock of impact from heavy shells. The design of the Borodinos' armour was similar in construction to that of the Ganguts and therefore needed to be modified, which slowed construction. The Borodinos' deck armour was reinforced with extra plates and the thickness of the turret roofs was increased. To offset this additional weight, a planned rear conning tower was removed entirely and the thickness of the main belt was slightly reduced. Mortise and tenon joints were introduced between the armour plates along their vertical edges to better distribute the shock of a shell impact and to lessen the stress on the supporting hull structure. The launching of the first pair of ships was postponed by six months because of these changes, plus delays imposed by the many ship orders already in hand.

General characteristics 
High-tensile steel was used throughout the hull with mild steel used only in areas that did not contribute to structural strength. The hull was subdivided by 25 transverse watertight bulkheads and the engine room was divided by a longitudinal bulkhead. The design called for a freeboard of  forward,  amidships and  aft. The ships were fitted with three Frahm anti-rolling tanks on each side.

Propulsion 
The forward boilers were grouped into three compartments with three oil-fired boilers in each compartment. The rear boilers were in four compartments with each containing four coal-fired boilers fitted with oil sprayers to increase the burn rate.

Two sets of steam turbines were ordered on 22 April 1913 from the Franco-Russian Works in Saint Petersburg for the Admiralty Shipyard-built ships, and the Baltic Works built the turbines for its ships, although some components were ordered from abroad. However, Western sources have long stated incorrectly that the turbines for Navarin had been ordered from AG Vulcan, and that they were taken over at start of the war for use in the  light cruisers. As well as being contradicted by original Russian and German records, this is technically impossible, as the turbines actually specified for Navarin were of the Parsons type, while those actually employed in the German cruisers were of the Curtis pattern. In fact, the Brummer class engines had been ordered for the lead ship of the Svetlana-class cruisers.

These were in four compartments below the main deck, two each fore and aft of the boiler and engine rooms. The generators powered a complex electrical system that combined alternating current for most equipment with direct current for heavy-load machinery such as the turret motors.

Armament 
The ships' primary armament consisted of a dozen 52-calibre  Model 1913 guns mounted in four electrically powered turrets. The turrets were designed to elevate and traverse at a rate of 3° per second. The guns had an elevation range from −5° to +25°. They could be loaded at any angle between −5° and +15°; the expected rate of fire was three rounds per minute. Space was provided for a maximum of 80 rounds per gun.

The secondary armament consisted of twenty-four 55-calibre  Pattern 1913 guns mounted in casemates in the hull, twelve per side.

The anti-aircraft armament was intended to be four 38-calibre  anti-aircraft guns fitted on the upper deck with 220 rounds carried for each gun. Four  guns were to be mounted in pairs on the main turret roofs for sub-calibre training with the main guns. Six underwater  torpedo tubes were fitted, three on each broadside; they were provided with a total of eighteen torpedoes.

Fire control 
The fore and aft main gun turrets were given a  rangefinder, and there was another  unit on top of the conning tower. These would provide data for the Geisler central artillery post analogue computer, which would then transmit commands to the gun crew. The mechanical fire-control computer would have been either a Pollen Argo range clock, which had been bought in 1913, or a domestically designed Erikson system.

Protection 
The trials with Chesma greatly affected the armour protection design of the Borodino-class ships. The Krupp cemented-armour plates were resized to match the frames and provide support for their joints; they were also locked together with mortise-and-tenon joints to better distribute the shock of a shell's impact. The  waterline belt covered the middle  of the ship. The remaining portion of the waterline was protected by  plates. It thinned to 75 millimetres forward of the casemates and extended all the way to the bow. The rear portion of the forecastle deck was protected by an upward extension of the upper belt in the area of the forward barbettes and the upper casemates. Those casemates were protected by 100-millimetre transverse bulkheads. The bulkhead sloped away from the edge of the lower deck to the lower edge of the armour belt with a total thickness of 75 millimetres divided between a 50-millimetre plate of Krupp non-cemented armour (KNC) layered above a 25-millimetre nickel-steel plate. The forward end of the armoured citadel was protected separately and the transverse bulkhead was therefore only 75 millimetres thick.

The main gun turrets were designed with 300-millimetre sides and 150-millimetre roofs. The gun ports would have been protected by 50-millimetre plates with 25-millimetre bulkheads separating each gun inside the turrets. They were shaped like truncated cones which matched the trajectories of descending shells and thus lessened their protective value. The funnel uptakes were protected by 50 millimetres of armour. Underwater protection was minimal: there was only a  watertight bulkhead behind the upward extension of the double bottom, and this became thinner as the hull narrowed towards the end turrets.

Construction 
All four ships were officially laid down on 19 December 1912, and work began in March–April 1913. After a progress review on 4 June 1914, launching of the first pair of ships was delayed until October. When World War I began in August, the hull of Izmail was judged as being 43percent complete, the others lagging considerably behind. The war caused further delays as some components had been ordered from foreign manufacturers. For example, the gun turrets were intended to rest on  roller bearings made in Germany, but attempts to order replacements from the United Kingdom and Sweden proved futile, as no company was willing and able to make the bearings. The war caused other delays, including competition for scarce resources needed by other production deemed necessary for the war. Three of the four ships were launched in 1915, but it was clear that Russian industry would not be able to complete them during the war, mostly because the turrets were seriously delayed by non-delivery of foreign-built components and a shortage of steel. They were reclassified as second rank projects by the Main Administration of Shipbuilding in 1916 and construction virtually stopped.

Various plans were made by the Naval General Staff and the Main Administration of Shipbuilding for the post-war completion of the ships, including modifying the turrets to load at a fixed angle of +4° to reduce the weight and complexity of the loading equipment. There were suggestions to improve the machinery with geared turbines, turbo-electric drive, or Föttinger's hydraulic transmission, but these were more theoretical than practical.

After the February Revolution, the condition of the ships was assessed on 28 April 1917. The ship that was furthest along was still Izmail: her hull, engines, and boilers were around 65percent complete, and her armour was 36percent complete. Her turrets were not expected to be completed until 1919. The Congress of Shipyard Workers decided to continue work on the Izmail in mid-1917, but only to provide jobs. The Provisional Government halted all work on Borodino, Kinburn, and Navarin on 24 October 1917, and the Bolsheviks ordered work on Izmail halted on 14 December 1917.

After the end of the Russian Civil War was in sight by October 1921, the victorious Bolsheviks considered finishing Izmail, and possibly Borodino, to their original design. It would have taken at least two years to build all of Izmails turrets, even if enough guns had been available. Ten had been delivered by Vickers before the Revolution and one gun had been completed domestically in 1912, but the prospects for more guns were not promising, given the poor state of Soviet heavy industry in the wake of the civil war. Another problem was their complicated electrical system; it could not be completed under current conditions, and at least twenty months would be required to replace it with a simpler system.

The Soviets also considered finishing Kinburn and Navarin to a modified design that featured  guns; a two-gun turret weighed slightly less than a triple  gun turret. The proposal was rejected because the prospects of actually acquiring such guns were minimal. Domestic industry was incapable of building such large guns and the Soviets were not able to purchase the guns from any foreign company. Other ideas were examined for the three less complete ships. These included converting the hulls to cargo ships, passenger liners, or  oil barges, but the hulls were thought to be too large and unwieldy for the proposed uses. None of the proposals was accepted, and all three of the less complete ships were sold to a German company for scrap on 21 August 1923 to raise much-needed cash for the government.

This proposal was approved by Alexey Rykov, Chairman of the Council of the People's Commissars on 6 July 1925, but the Red Army was strongly opposed to spending more money on naval projects. They managed to block the project by gaining control of a commission appointed to review the needs of the Navy in December, which cancelled the project on 16 March 1926.

Ships 
The ships were named after battles fought by the Russian Empire:

Notes

References

Bibliography

Further reading

External links 

 Battleships-cruisers site
 Russian navy site 

Battlecruiser classes
 
Proposed ships